Alma Beatriz Rengifo López (1953 – 10 January 2015) was a Colombian lawyer and politician of the Colombian Liberal Party. She served as general secretary of the Ministry of Foreign Trade, Minister of Justice and Law, and National Registrar.

Biography
Alma Beatriz Rengifo was born in Silvia, Cauca in 1953. She earned a law degree from the University of Cauca, and a doctorate in political science at the Xavierian University in 1975.

She was appointed Minister of Justice and Law of Colombia, as well as delegate minister with executive functions in the government of Ernesto Samper. In addition, she served as legal secretary and deputy director of the Administrative Department of the Presidency, ad hoc legal secretary to learn about matters related to the events that occurred in the Palace of Justice siege by the 19th of April Movement, delegate for administrative contracting, and adviser of the Ministry of Development.

In August 2002, Rengifo became National Registrar in the administration of President Álvaro Uribe. Additionally, she served as legal secretary of the presidency and as general secretary of the Communications and Foreign Trade portfolios. She served as executive director of the Scenarios Corporation, and was a postgraduate speaker at the Xavierian University, within the Faculty of Legal Sciences. Her law practice focused on consultancy in administrative law, administrative contracting, and commercial law.

She was general secretary and head of the legal office of Telecóm at Caracol Radio's Primera Cadena Radial Colombiana SA.

Alma Beatriz Rengifo died in Bogotá on 10 January 2015.

References

1953 births
2015 deaths
20th-century Colombian lawyers
Colombian Liberal Party politicians
Colombian women lawyers
Ministers of Justice and Law of Colombia
People from Cauca Department
Pontifical Xavierian University alumni
University of Cauca alumni
Women government ministers of Colombia
Female justice ministers
20th-century women lawyers